Georgia May Ayeesha Jagger (born 12 January 1992) is a British-American fashion model and designer.

Early life
Jagger was born at Portland Hospital in West End, London, England, to British Rolling Stones lead singer Mick Jagger and American supermodel Jerry Hall. She has three siblings from her parents, Elizabeth, James, and Gabriel. Additionally, she has several half-siblings from her father's other relationships: Karis, Jade, Lucas, and Deveraux. She was raised near Richmond Park and moved to New York City in autumn 2010.

Career 
In 2008, Jagger signed with Independent Models, and is currently represented by TESS Model Management. She debuted at Chanel's Resort 2011 show, which she closed. She has also walked for Tommy Hilfiger, Balmain, Vivienne Westwood, Alexander Wang, Miu Miu, Sonia Rykiel, Thierry Mugler, Marchesa, Versace, Fendi, Tom Ford, rag & bone, Isabel Marant, Louis Vuitton, Marc Jacobs, and Just Cavalli among others.

In 2009, Jagger was named Model of the Year at the Fashion Awards by the British Fashion Council. She was the face of Hudson Jeans from 2009 to 2013. In 2009, she began a contract with English cosmetics company Rimmel. She has appeared in advertisements for the Thierry Mugler fragrance, Angel.

Jagger took part in the 2012 Summer Olympics closing ceremony with Kate Moss, Naomi Campbell and Lily Donaldson, representing British fashion.

In 2014, she appeared in an international campaign for German jewellery concern Thomas Sabo's Glam & Soul and Karma Beads ladies' collections. The basis of the campaign was a short film by photographer Ellen von Unwerth.

Jagger has designed collections with Volcom and Mulberry.

References

External links

 
 

1992 births
English female models
American female models
20th-century American women
20th-century English women
English people of Australian descent
English people of American descent
English people of Irish descent
English people of Dutch descent
American people of Australian descent
American people of English descent
American people of Irish descent
American people of Dutch descent
Living people
People from Westminster
Citizens of the United States through descent
English emigrants to the United States
Models from New York City